These are the official results of the 2009 Central American and Caribbean Championships in Athletics which took place on July 3–7, 2009 in Havana, Cuba.

Note: Although each country could only have two representatives, Cuba, as the host, could also enter additional athletes. Their performances, however, were not eligible for medals at the competition. Results of such athletes are given below all others.

Men's results

100 meters

Heats – July 3Wind:Heat 1: 0.0 m/s, Heat 2: +0.1 m/s, Heat 3: -0.8 m/s, Heat 4: 0.0 m/s

Final – July 3Wind:+0.1 m/s

200 meters

Heats – July 5Wind:Heat 1: -0.3 m/s, Heat 2: +0.5 m/s, Heat 3: -0.5 m/s, Heat 4: -0.2 m/s

Final – July 5Wind:-1.1 m/s

400 meters

Heats – July 3

Final – July 3

800 meters

Heats – July 4

Final – July 5

1500 meters
July 4

5000 meters
July 5

10,000 meters
July 3

Half marathon
July 5

110 meters hurdles

Heats – July 3Wind:Heat 1: -0.3 m/s, Heat 2: -0.6 m/s

Final – July 3Wind:+2.5 m/s

400 meters hurdles

Heats – July 4

Final – July 5

3000 meters steeplechase
July 4

4 x 100 meters relay
Heats – July 4

Final – July 4

4 x 400 meters relay
July 5

20 kilometers walk
July 4

High jump
July 5

Pole vault
July 4

Long jump
July 4

Triple jump
July 5

Shot put
July 3

Discus throw
July 3

Hammer throw
July 4

Javelin throw
July 4

Decathlon
July 3–4

Women's results

100 meters

Heats – July 3Wind:Heat 1: +1.1 m/s, Heat 2: -0.5 m/s, Heat 3: +1.0 m/s

Final – July 3Wind:+0.8 m/s

200 meters

Heats – July 5Wind:Heat 1: -1.8 m/s, Heat 2: +0.2 m/s, Heat 3: +0.5 m/s

Final – July 5Wind:-1.2 m/s

400 meters

Heats – July 3

Final – July 3

800 meters
July 5

1500 meters
July 4

5000 meters
July 5

10,000 meters
July 3

Half marathon
July 5

100 meters hurdles

Heats – July 3Wind:Heat 1: -0.3 m/s, Heat 2: -0.4 m/s

Final – July 3Wind:+1.0 m/s

400 meters hurdles
July 5

3000 meters steeplechase
July 5

4 x 100 meters relay
July 4

4 x 400 meters relay
July 5

10 kilometers walk
July 4

High jump
July 4

Pole vault
July 3

Long jump
July 4

Triple jump
July 3

Shot put
July 5

Discus throw
July 3

Hammer throw
July 4

Javelin throw
July 5

Heptathlon
July 4–5

References
Results

Central American and Caribbean Championships
Events at the Central American and Caribbean Championships in Athletics